Trukcharopa is a genus of small, air-breathing land snails, terrestrial pulmonate gastropod mollusks in the family Charopidae.

Species
Species within the genus Trukcharopa include:
 Trukcharopa trukana

References

 
Charopidae
Taxonomy articles created by Polbot